Nacho Martínez (born Ignacio Martínez Navia-Osorio, 8 July 1952 – 24 July 1996) was a Spanish actor.

Biography
Born in Mieres, Asturias in 1952, Martínez began his film career as Tasio's brother in the movie Tasio directed by Montxo Armendáriz in 1984. However, the character for which he will be most remembered for is the bullfighter in the film Matador in 1986, Pedro Almodóvar, where he co-starred with a very young Antonio Banderas. With Almodóvar, he also acted in Law of Desire (1987) as well as High Heels (1991).

In 1986, Martínez was a candidate for Fotogramas de Plata as best actor, coincided with Ángela Molina in La Mitad del Cielo, by Manuel Gutiérrez Aragón, and had a small role in the cult movie Viaje a Ninguna Parte, directed by Fernando Fernán Gómez.

Along with his film career, Martínez had a long career as a voice actor in dubbing, film, and cartoons.

Martínez died after a long battle with lung cancer at the age of 44, which cut short the career of one of the most influential Spanish actors of the 1980s.

In 2006, Martínez was remembered at the twentieth edition of the Goya Awards.

Filmography
 Tasio (1984) - Hermano de Tasio
 Extramuros (1985)
 Caso Cerrado (1985) - Amante de Isabel
 Hierro dulce (1985)
 Matador (1986) - Diego
 El viaje a ninguna parte (1986)
 La Mitad del Cielo (1986) - Delgado
 Adiós, Pequeña (1986)
 Law of Desire (1987) - Doctor Martín
 Los días del cometa (1989)
 El anónimo... ¡vaya papelón! (1990) - Don Manuel
 A solas contigo (1990) - Carlos
 La viuda del capitán Estrada (1991) - Baltasar
 High Heels (1991) - Juan
 La febre d'Or (1993) - Barón de Esmalrich
 Mi Nombre es Sombra (1996) - Crane (uncredited) (final film role)

The Gijón International Film Festival granted a National Film Award named after 'Nacho Martínez', since 2002 to people who have contributed significantly to the film industry. It is a unique sculpture made by Jaime Herrero.

References

External links
 

1952 births
1996 deaths
Deaths from lung cancer in Spain
People from Mieres, Asturias
Spanish male film actors
Spanish male television actors
Spanish male voice actors
20th-century Spanish male actors